Tom Hutchinson is an English teacher and author working with Oxford University Press, who has taught English in the UK, Germany, and Croatia, as well as teacher training courses in many other countries around the world. For a number of years he lectured at the Institute for English Language Education at Lancaster University, UK.

Tom Hutchinson has published English language courses well-known and appreciated by many thousands of students around the world:
 New Hotline, 
 Project, 
 Project English, 
 Lifelines, 
 Lifetime Video, 
 American Hotline, 
 An Introduction to Project Work, 
 Big City and 
 the award-winning Project Video.

Works
 
 
 
 
 
 
 Eunice Hutchinson (formerly Torres): The textbook as agent of change
 Peter Ustinov: Niven's Hollywood
 Roy Pickard:  Horrors: A History of Horror Movies
 Sheridan Morley (general editor), Vincent Price: Horror & Fantasy in the Movies

References

External sources 
 Three Question Interview with Tom Hutchinson (video recording from 12 April 2010)

Teachers of English as a second or foreign language
Living people
Year of birth missing (living people)